Vias or VIAS may refer to:

 Vias (rail company), a rail company in Germany
 Vias, Hérault, a commune of the Hérault département in France
 Gare de Vias, a railway station
 Voluntary Industrial Aid for Spain

See also
 Via (disambiguation) for the singular of "vias"